The Hamrin Mountains are a small mountain ridge in northeast Iraq. The westernmost ripple of the greater Zagros mountains, the Hamrin mountains extend from the Diyala Governorate bordering Iran, northwest to the Tigris river, crossing northern Saladin Governorate and southern Kirkuk Governorate.

In antiquity, the mountains were part of the frontier region between Lower Mesopotamia (Babylonia) to the south and Upper Mesopotamia(Assyria) to the north.

References

External links
 Jabal Hamrin - Iraq

Mountain ranges of Iraq
Zagros Mountains
Diyala Governorate
Kirkuk Governorate
Saladin Governorate